1761 Edmondson, provisional designation , is a dark background asteroid from the outer regions of the asteroid belt, approximately 21 kilometers in diameter. It was discovered on 30 March 1952, by the Indiana Asteroid Program at Goethe Link Observatory, United States. It was named after astronomer Frank Edmondson.

Orbit and classification 

Edmondson is a background asteroid, located near the region occupied by the Themis family, a dynamical family of outer-belt asteroids with nearly coplanar ecliptical orbits. It orbits the Sun in the outer main-belt at a distance of 2.4–3.9 AU once every 5 years and 8 months (2,068 days). Its orbit has an eccentricity of 0.23 and an inclination of 2° with respect to the ecliptic.

Physical characteristics 

Edmondson has been characterized as a carbonaceous C-type asteroid.

Rotation period 

In November 2012, a rotational lightcurve of Edmondson was obtained from photometric observations at the Etscorn Campus Observatory in New Mexico, United States. Lightcurve analysis gave a well-defined rotation period of 4.208 hours with a brightness variation of 0.29 magnitude.

Diameter and albedo 

According to the surveys carried out by the Japanese Akari satellite, Edmondson measures 21.94 kilometers in diameter and its surface has an albedo of 0.102, while the Collaborative Asteroid Lightcurve Link assumes a more typical albedo for carbonaceous asteroids of 0.08 and calculates a diameter of 20.51 kilometers with an absolute magnitude of 11.8.

Naming 

This minor planet was named for astronomer Frank K. Edmondson (1912–2008) of Indiana University, the program's founder and director. The official  was published by the Minor Planet Center on 20 February 1971.

References

External links 
 Asteroid Lightcurve Database (LCDB), query form (info )
 Dictionary of Minor Planet Names, Google books
 Asteroids and comets rotation curves, CdR – Observatoire de Genève, Raoul Behrend
 Discovery Circumstances: Numbered Minor Planets (1)-(5000) – Minor Planet Center
 
 

001761
001761
Named minor planets
19520330